Man for all the chores (Greek: Άνθρωπος για όλες τις δουλειές) is a 1966 Greek film directed by Giorgos Konstantinou, written by Giorgos Lazaridis and Hristos Kyriakos and a production of Roussopuloi Company.

Plot
Giorgos Gasparatos, son of the shipowner captain Manolis  with his father and resided with family use.  He encounter from the waiter and tried to change his live with his right.  He believe he can become rich working under the stress and the loneliness of the powerful.

Cast

Contribution  to music
The film's  soundtrack contains pioneer performances in the Greek jazz music scene.  In 2002 the archived music played in the film was digitized using the  original mastertapes.

References

External links
 
  at cine.gr 

1966 films
1966 comedy films
1960s Greek-language films
Greek comedy films